Sergio Postigo Redondo (born 4 November 1988) is a Spanish professional footballer who plays for Levante UD as a central defender.

Club career
Born in Madrid, Postigo finished his development at CD Leganés, and made his senior debut with the reserves in the regional leagues. Also in the 2007–08 season, he began appearing with the first team in the Segunda División B.

In July 2010, Postigo signed with CA Osasuna, being initially assigned to the B side also in the third division. On 13 January 2012, he appeared in his first game as a professional, playing the last 11 minutes of a 1–2 home loss against FC Barcelona in the round of 16 of the Copa del Rey.

Postigo was released by the Navarrese in May 2012, and shortly after moved to another reserve team, Getafe CF B. In July of the following year, however, he was released again, returning to former club Leganés shortly after.

On 20 July 2015, Postigo moved abroad for the first time in his career, joining Spezia Calcio from the Italian Serie B after paying his €300.000 buyout clause. On 16 July of the following year he returned to Spain, signing a two-year contract with Segunda División side Levante UD.

Postigo contributed two goals in 36 appearances in his first season, as his team achieved promotion to La Liga. He made his debut in the competition on 21 August 2017, starting in a 1–0 home win over Villarreal CF.

Honours
Levante
Segunda División: 2016–17

References

External links

1988 births
Living people
Spanish footballers
Footballers from Madrid
Association football defenders
La Liga players
Segunda División players
Segunda División B players
Tercera División players
Divisiones Regionales de Fútbol players
CD Leganés B players
CD Leganés players
CA Osasuna B players
CA Osasuna players
Getafe CF B players
Levante UD footballers
Serie B players
Spezia Calcio players
Spanish expatriate footballers
Expatriate footballers in Italy
Spanish expatriate sportspeople in Italy